This is a list of notable telecommunications companies of Bangladesh.

A 

 Airtel

B

 Banglalink
 Bijoy Phone
 BTCL

G

 Grameen Telecom
 Grameenphone

O

 Onetel Communication Ltd.

P

 PeoplesTel

R

 RanksTel
 RealVU
 Robi

S

 SAtel

T

 Telebarta
 TeleTalk

U

 United Communication Service

Lists of companies of Bangladesh
 
Bangladesh communications-related lists
Bangladesh